Nicholas D'Agosto  (born April 17, 1980) is an American actor, best known for featuring in Final Destination 5, Heroes and The Office. He starred in the Showtime series Masters of Sex and the Fox series Gotham.

Early life
D'Agosto was born in Omaha, Nebraska, the son of Deanna Rae (née Vellinga) and Alan D'Agosto, Omaha's major Arby's restaurant franchisee. His mother is from Sioux City, Iowa, while his father is from Omaha. 

He has two older brothers, Andrew and Patrick, and two younger sisters, Julie and Katie.

D'Agosto was raised Catholic and selected Genesius of Rome, the patron saint of actors, as his confirmation name. D'Agosto said that he wanted to be a priest when he was young, then when he was 10 years old he started getting into improv.

D'Agosto was very involved in drama and theatre growing up, acting in many different plays and musicals. He participated in competitive forensics speech tournaments during sixth, seventh, and eighth grades. He graduated from Creighton Preparatory School in 1998 and attended Marquette University, where he graduated cum laude in 2002 with a double major in history and theatre.

Career
D'Agosto's big break came when he was cast as the ethical committee chairman Larry Fouch in the dark teenage comedy Election (1999), while he was still a senior at Creighton Prep. The film was written and directed by Alexander Payne, another alumnus of Creighton Prep. D'Agosto starred in the film Psycho Beach Party (2000) while still in college. In 2002, he moved to Los Angeles to pursue a full-time acting career.

He landed guest appearances on primetime television series such as Boston Public, ER, Six Feet Under, Cold Case, House, Supernatural, and Without a Trace. He appeared in three episodes of The Office. He also played West Rosen on the series Heroes.

To prepare for the film Fired Up!, D'Agosto spent three weeks at a cheer camp and worked with a professional choreographer. He also starred in From Prada to Nada with Camilla Belle, which is loosely based on Jane Austen's Sense and Sensibility.  In 2011, he starred as Sam Lawton in Final Destination 5.

In Fall 2012, D'Agosto played the role of Tony Kirby in You Can't Take It with You.

As of 2013, D'Agosto co-starred in Showtime's Masters of Sex as obstetrician Dr. Ethan Haas, fictional protégé of pioneering sex researcher Dr. William H. Masters (of Masters and Johnson fame). His character is a composite of two of Masters' actual associates.

To prepare for the part of Dr. Haas, in addition to reading the biography that Masters of Sex is based on, D'Agosto read The Fifties by David Halberstam. He also watched movies from the 1950s and documentaries on journalist Edward R. Murrow, which had a lot of "individual footage of interviews with these sort of everyday people from that time period."

In late 2014 he appeared on Grey's Anatomy playing the OB/GYN surgical resident Graham Maddox. He left the show late November 2014 in the episode 'Risk'

D'Agosto was cast in early October 2015 in the role of Harvey Dent in the television series Gotham.

In 2017, D'Agosto starred in the lead role in NBC's mockumentary legal comedy series, Trial & Error. Season 2 wrapped in August 2018.

In November 2022, D'Agosto has a recurring role as Deputy Director Doug Bailey in Criminal Minds: Evolution.

Personal life
He married Andrea Bricco in 2015. They have one child, a son.

Filmography

Film

Television

Music videos

References

External links
 

1980 births
20th-century American male actors
21st-century American male actors
American male film actors
American male television actors
American people of Italian descent
Catholics from Nebraska
Living people
Male actors from Omaha, Nebraska
Marquette University alumni